The Man with the Red Tattoo, first published in 2002, was the sixth and final original novel by Raymond Benson featuring Ian Fleming's character James Bond. Carrying the Ian Fleming Publications copyright, it was first published in the United Kingdom by Hodder & Stoughton and in the United States by Putnam. It was later published in Japan in 2003. The novel's working title was Red Widow Dawn.

After the publication of The Man with the Red Tattoo, Benson wrote the novelisation of Die Another Day, which was published later in the year. Die Another Day is considered Benson's final James Bond novel, the following Bond stories being a series of novels about a teenage James Bond in the 1930s by Charlie Higson (see Young Bond), and a trilogy of faux-autobiographies by Samantha Weinberg entitled The Moneypenny Diaries, focusing on Miss Moneypenny. On 28 August 2005 Ian Fleming Publications confirmed that it was planning to publish a one-off adult Bond novel in 2008 to mark the 100th anniversary of Ian Fleming's birth. In July 2007 it was confirmed that the book had been completed by Sebastian Faulks, titled Devil May Care.

Benson at one time had plans to release a collection of short Bond stories, but after abruptly announcing his retirement in early 2003 from writing Bond novels, the project was never pursued. Not counting novelisations, The Man with the Red Tattoo marks the 35th original James Bond novel (including short story collections) since Ian Fleming introduced the character nearly 50 years earlier.

Plot introduction
On a flight from Japan to the United Kingdom, a young Japanese woman dies of a mysterious illness. The illness is a mutated version of the West Nile virus. James Bond finds out that not only was she the daughter of an important Japanese businessman, her entire family is also dead. James Bond travels to Japan in search of the killer. Here Bond reunites with his longtime friend Tiger Tanaka, who introduces him to a female Japanese agent who is later killed by the mutant virus.

Publication history
 UK first hardback edition: 2 May 2002 Hodder & Stoughton
 US first hardback edition: 6 June 2002 Putnam
 UK first paperback edition: 9 June 2003 Coronet Books
 US first paperback edition: May 2003 Jove Books

See also
 Outline of James Bond

References

External links
 Official Japanese 007 museum website
 CBn The Man With The Red Tattoo Review
 CBn Raymond Benson Interview, Part III
 "Her Majesty's Secret Servant: Return of the Gaijin" (Michael Reed reviews The Man with the Red Tattoo)

2002 British novels
James Bond books
Novels by Raymond Benson
Hodder & Stoughton books
Novels set in Japan
Japan in non-Japanese culture